The Battle of Doiran was a battle of the Second Balkan War, fought between the Bulgaria and Greece. The battle took place in June 1913.

The Hellenic Army, after the victory at Kilkis-Lachanas, continued their advance north and successfully engaged the Bulgarians at Lake Doiran. The Bulgarian army had retreated to the lake, after having destroyed the bridges of Strymon River and burned the town of Serres. As a result of their subsequent defeat, the Bulgarian forces retreated further north.

Battle
The Doiran Lake  was at the right wing of the Bulgarian line of defense. The 2nd Bulgarian Army was responsible for the defense of this sector. The Bulgarian artillery was for some time successful against the Greek attack. When the Evzones captured the train station of Doiran, fearing that they would be encircled, retreated further north. Following orders by King Constantine, the Greek army captured Gevgelija, Meleniko, Petrich and advanced in the Bulgarian territory aiming to capture Sofia.

Another part of the Greek army marched eastern to capture Drama and Western Thrace, while ships of the Greek navy with an amphibious operation were landed at Kavala.

References

Notes

Citations

Sources
 Hellenic Army General Staff, Army History Directorate, A concise history of the Balkan Wars 1912–1913, Athens 1998.  
 W. H. Crawfurd Price. The Balkan Cockpit - The Political and Military Story of the Balkan Wars. Read Books, 2008. 

Battles of the Second Balkan War
Conflicts in 1913
Battles involving Bulgaria
Battles involving Greece
Military history of North Macedonia
1913 in Bulgaria
1913 in Greece
June 1913 events